Park Jeong-min (born March 24, 1987) is a South Korean actor. He is best known for starring in the films Bleak Night (2011), Dongju: The Portrait of a Poet (2015), Keys to the Heart (2018), and Deliver Us from Evil (2020). He is also the writer of best-selling book A Useful Person.

Education
In 2005, Park enrolled at the prestigious Korea University and subsequently dropped out with the intention to become a filmmaker. He then majored in film making at Korea National University of Arts, but later switched his major to acting after his military discharge.

Career

2011–2016: Breakthrough and critical acclaim
In 2011, Park made his screen debut with the critically acclaimed independent film Bleak Night, for which he was nominated for Best New Actor at the 20th Buil Film Awards. 

He made his breakthrough in 2016 with his performance in Dongju: The Portrait of a Poet as Song Mong-gyu, a cousin of the poet Yun Dong-ju who was known for his resistance writings during the Japanese occupation of Korea. His portrayal garnered him Best New Actor awards at the 52nd Baeksang Arts Awards, the 37th Blue Dragon Film Awards, the 36th Golden Cinema Festival, the Korea Film Actors Association Awards, the 16th Director's Cut Awards, and a Best Supporting Actor award at the 22nd Chunsa Film Art Awards.

2017–present: Rising popularity and directorial debut
In 2017, Park returned to theater as Romeo in the Korean adaptation of William Shakespeare's Romeo and Juliet with Moon Geun-young playing Juliet. 

In 2018, he starred in the comedy-drama film Keys to the Heart as a gifted pianist with savant syndrome. The same year, Park appeared in the superhero film Psychokinesis and headlined Lee Joon-ik's drama film Sunset in My Hometown in which he plays a rapper. With the help of professional rappers, Park practiced rapping for a year, and wrote lyrics for the songs that appeared in the film. 

In 2019, Park starred in mystery thriller Svaha: The Sixth Finger followed by lead roles in the crime drama film Tazza: One Eyed Jack and the webtoon-based comedy film Start-Up. 

In 2020, Park was part of the main cast of Netflix original film Time to Hunt which premiered at the 70th Berlin International Film Festival. Later that year, Park acted alongside Hwang Jung-min and Lee Jung-jae in the action film Deliver Us from Evil as Yui, a transgender woman who wishes to undergo sex reassignment surgery but cannot afford to do so. The film became the second highest-grossing South Korean film of 2020. For his portrayal, Park won Best Supporting Actor at the 41st Blue Dragon Film Awards, Best Supporting Actor (Film) at the 57th Baeksang Arts Awards, Best Supporting Actor at the 40th Korean Association of Film Critics Awards, and Best Supporting Actor at the 26th Chunsa Film Art Awards.    Park also wrote and directed a music video for RECONNECT as part of a special project in celebration of ELLE Korea's 28th anniversary. 

In 2021, Park starred in the drama film Miracle: Letters to the President. He made his directorial debut with short film Unframed – Vote for Inno which premiered at the 26th Busan International Film Festival alongside Netflix original series Hellbound in which Park made his small screen comeback.

Other ventures
In 2014, Park became a writer of a monthly column for Topclass magazine and established a following of devoted readers. His column is called “Eonhee,” which means “to make others happy through words.” 

Known for his humorous and self-deprecating writing style, Park published his own book of essays in 2016, titled A Useful Person. The book became a best-seller and had its 12th round of printing as of 2019. 

Park also owns a bookstore and cafe called Book, Night, Day in Hapjeong-dong, Seoul which opened in 2019. 

At the end of 2020, Park established his own book publishing company, Muze Books, and became the editor of the first book published by the company.

Filmography

Film

As actor

As director and scriptwriter

Television series

Music video

Theater

Awards and nominations

References

External links
 
 
 
 Park Jung-min at SEM Company

1987 births
Living people
South Korean male film actors
South Korean male television actors
South Korean male stage actors
21st-century South Korean male actors
Korea National University of Arts alumni
South Korean male musical theatre actors
Best New Actor Paeksang Arts Award (film) winners
Best Supporting Actor Paeksang Arts Award (film) winners